The Riverside Police Department is the law enforcement agency responsible for the city of Riverside, California.

History

The Riverside Police Department was founded in 1896 and has grown from a small frontier town police force to a large metropolitan police department with over 409 sworn police employees and 200 civilian employees. A leader in developing officer safety tactics and emergency response approaches, Riverside PD has long provided training materials to police academies and other law enforcement agencies across the nation. For example, the current method of initiating a traffic stop on a high-risk offender in a moving vehicle, known in law enforcement as a "felony traffic stop", was first put into use by Riverside officers. This safety technique spread throughout the police profession with nearly all law enforcement agencies in the nation utilizing it.

In 1998, a woman named Tyisha Miller was found by her relatives unconscious and foaming at the mouth in a locked car, with a gun on her lap. Her relatives called 911 and four Riverside Police officers arrived. An officer forced his way into the car and attempted to remove the weapon. The officers claimed that Miller sat up and grabbed the weapon, at which point the officers opened fire, hitting her with at least 12 shots. Later, it was determined that Miller had not reached for the gun and may have still been unconscious at the time. The United States Attorney announced an investigation of the shooting; ultimately the officers were fired but not prosecuted.

In 2010, Sergio G. Diaz was sworn in as the new Chief of Police, replacing former Chief Russ Leach, who left after a drunken driving incident.

Organization
The RPD is situated in several police buildings. The downtown headquarters building houses the Office of the Chief of Police, Community Services Bureau, Administrative Division (Personnel), Records Bureau, Communications Bureau, and the Emergency Operations Center.

The Field Operations Division, Patrol and Traffic Services, are at the Lincoln Police Station (8181 Lincoln Ave). Internal Affairs, General and Special Investigations offices are located in the Magnolia Police Station (10540 Magnolia Avenue).

Leadership

References

External links
Official website

Municipal police departments of California
Organizations based in Riverside, California
Law enforcement in Riverside County, California
Government in Riverside, California
1896 establishments in California